Irianassa sapphiropa is a moth of the family Tortricidae first described by Edward Meyrick in 1905. It is found in Sri Lanka.

References

External links

Moths of Asia
Moths described in 1905